Azzaba is a town and commune in Azzaba District, Skikda Province, Algeria.

See Also

Communes of Skikda Province